The Liverpool Royal Institution was a learned society set up in 1814 for "the Promotion of Literature, Science and the Arts". William Corrie, William Rathbone IV, Thomas Stewart Traill and William Roscoe were among the founders. It was sometimes called the Royal Society of Liverpool.

A royal charter was granted in 1821. The institute purchased a building on Colquitt Street where a lecture program was started. It also included an art gallery which hosted John James Audubon's first European exhibition, in 1826. A new building to host the gallery was built in 1841 and its director was William John Swainson. A grammar school for boys, the Royal Institution School, ran until 1892.

After the construction of the William Brown Library and Museum, and Walker Art Gallery the institute fell into decline, its collections were moved to the gallery and its archives moved to University College Liverpool. The institute was dissolved in 1948.

Slave trade
The house was built for the slave trader Thomas Parr. Parr sold his house to the institution and was one of its founder members. Many of the people who set up the institution were former slave traders.

References

External links
 
 

Cultural organisations based in Liverpool
Regional and local learned societies of the United Kingdom
1814 establishments in England
Organizations established in 1814